"This Is Your Night" is a song recorded by Dutch singer Amber, released on 21 May 1996 as the lead single from her debut album of the same name (1996). It is written by Amber, and produced by the Berman Brothers and other programmers. In January 1996, a promotional version of this track was released to select Rhythmic Top 40/dance radio stations in New York and Chicago. This version, received minimal airplay before being replaced entirely with the now known "Original Edit," and was never released on any album or single. 

"This Is Your Night" reached number one in Israel, and had great success in many countries, particularly in Australia, Belgium, Japan, Lebanon, the Netherlands, New Zealand and Spain. It charted in the top 40 in the United States and gained further prominence after appearing in the 1998 American comedy film, A Night at the Roxbury. On the Billboard Hot 100, "This Is Your Night" wound up only being in the 1996 year-end chart, although peaking just over number 25 in 1997.

Chart performance
"This Is Your Night" was a major hit on several continents. In Europe, it peaked at number three in Spain, number 14 in the Netherlands and number 33 in Iceland. Outside Europe, the single reached number-one in Israel in January 1997, number three in Japan, number ten on the Canadian RPM Dance/Urban chart, number 11 in Australia and number 40 in New Zealand. In the US, it went to number 24 on the Billboard Hot 100, number ten on the Billboard Hot Dance Club Play chart and number seven on the Billboard Mainstream Top 40 chart. 

"This Is Your Night" was awarded with a gold record in Australia, with a sale of 35,000 singles.

Critical reception
Barry Walters for The Advocate complimented the song as a "sugarcoated treat". Alex Henderson from AllMusic viewed it as "catchy". Larry Flick from Billboard praised the song, viewing it as "Euro-NRG of the highest and most festive quality". He added that "she oozes with endearing girlish charm and a squeaky-cute voice", noting the "immediately infectious chorus". On the single review, Flick remarked that the normally hip-hop-rooted Tommy Boy "dives head-first into the ongoing Euro-NRG craze with a bouncy anthem that will have folks who never get enough of La Bouche-styled rhythm twirling with ear-to-ear grins." He concluded, "Amber has enough charisma to push this single over the top." Chuck Campbell from Knoxville News Sentinel felt that "positive energy radiates" from the song. L.A. Times declared it as a "classic house groove", stating that "Amber works the beats like a pro, turning each phrase into a perfect fusion of rhythm and melody." They continued, "In fact, there's something downright addictive about the "dabba-dabba-dop, dip-dop-n-day" phrase she sprinkles" through the song. A reviewer from Sun-Sentinel described it as "a chirpy, made-for-the-turntables pop number."

Music video
The accompanying music video for "This Is Your Night" was filmed in New York City, directed by Jeff Kennedy, and produced by Nicola Doring. It premiered in October 1996. It features Amber singing in a pool wearing a glittery jewelled headpiece and surrounded by flowers floating on the water posing with "prayer hands". Other scenes features the singer performing on a bed or in front of a small mirror in a jewel box. She is also seen dancing with other dancers. In between male dancers are dancing in showering water. In the video words like 'free', 'forever', 'true', 'yeah', 'girl', 'night', 'love' and 'heart' are projected with light on the dancers. In the end Amber lies sleeping in her bed. The video was later published on Tommy Boy's official YouTube channel in July 2018, and had generated more than 11 million views as of December 2022.

Impact and legacy
American magazine Vibe ranked "This is Your Night" number 13 in their list of "Before EDM: 30 Dance Tracks from the '90s That Changed the Game" in 2013. BuzzFeed ranked the song number seven in their list of "The 101 Greatest Dance Songs of the '90s" in 2017.

Remixes
On June 17, 2022, the Junior Vasquez Sunday Night Bump Extended Remix, which was never previously issued commercially, was released to all digital platforms internationally as part of "Amber Remixed - Extended Versions" long form compilation of club remixes.

As of 2022, the following versions of "This is Your Night" are available for download:
The original album version (1996)
The 6 track CD maxi single (1996)
Two remixes on "The Hits Remixed (2000)": Track 7: Mousse T. Remix 4:20 and Track 10: Junior Vasquez Sunday Night Bump Extended Mix 8:44, 
The extremely popular 3 track Re-Recorded Single (JMCA, 2008), and 5. Two club mixes on "The Hits Remixed - Extended (2022 Digital Release)": Track 5: Junior Vasquez Sunday Night Bump Extended Mix 8:44, and Track 6: Mousse T. Remix - Extended 6:35.

Dispute
There has been an ongoing dispute between Amber and the Berman Brothers regarding the publishing shares on the title. The Berman Brothers had Amber write 98% of the lyrics and singing melody in a studio in Hamburg to a basic track and yet they claimed most of the publishing shares for the title. In 1997, Amber's share was reduced to only 6.6% behind her back, as the Berman Brothers added the title to their publishing company Shark Media.

Track listing

Charts

Weekly charts

Year-end charts

Certifications

References

External links
 Amber - This Is Your Night at Dance Music Space

1996 debut singles
1996 songs
Amber (singer) songs
House music songs
Number-one singles in Israel
Tommy Boy Records singles